The 1982 NCAA Division II women's basketball tournament was the inaugural tournament hosted by the NCAA to determine the team national champion of women's collegiate basketball among its Division II membership in the United States. The 1982 AIAW Division II championship was a separate tournament.

Cal Poly Pomona defeated Tuskegee in the championship game, 93–74, to claim the first-ever NCAA Division II national title.

The championship rounds were contested at the Springfield Civic Center in Springfield, Massachusetts, hosted by Springfield College.

Qualifying
Sixteen teams participated in the inaugural tournament field.

Brackets - First and Second rounds
Visiting team listed first

Final Four – Springfield, Massachusetts
Location: Springfield Civic Center Host: Springfield College

All-tournament team
Jackie White, Cal Poly Pomona (MOP)
Annette Chester, Tuskegee
Carol Welch, Cal Poly Pomona
Brenda McLean, Oakland
Becky Lovett, Mount St. Mary's

See also
 1982 NCAA Division I women's basketball tournament
 1982 NCAA Division III women's basketball tournament
 1982 AIAW National Division I Basketball Championship
 1982 NAIA women's basketball tournament
 1982 NCAA Division II men's basketball tournament

References
 1982 NCAA Division II women's basketball tournament jonfmorse.com

NCAA Division II women's basketball tournament
NCAA Division II women's basketball tournament